Miss Tourism Vietnam (Vietnamese: Hoa hậu Du lịch Việt Nam) is a national beauty pageant of Vietnam, established for the first time in 2008. The contest brings the mission of promoting Vietnam's tourism, culture and friendship to the world.

The winner of this year's contest will be sent to the upcoming Miss Tourism International 2023. The previous winner, Phan Ngoc Diem, was also sent to participate in Miss Tourism International 2008.

Miss Tourism Vietnam select the emissaries oriented towards the beauty of the body, intellect and soul for Vietnamese youth in the period of renovation and integration.

The reigning Miss Tourism Vietnam is Luong Ky Duyen from Thai Binh, who will be crowned on November 13, 2022, in Phu Quoc, Kien Giang.

Titleholders

Vietnam's representatives at Miss Tourism International 
Color keys

References

Beauty pageants in Vietnam